A rat-tail splice, also known as a twist splice or a pig-tail splice, is a very basic electrical splice that can be done with both solid and stranded wire. It is made by taking two or more bare wires and wrapping them together symmetrically around the common axis of both wires. The bare splice can be insulated with electrical tape or other means.

This common and simple splice is not very strong mechanically. It can be made stronger by coating it with solder, or it can be twisted and then held in place by the internal metal spring or threads of a twist-on wire connector, also called a wire nut. Because it is not very strong, the splice is not meant to connect wires that will be pulled or stressed. Rather, it is intended for wires that are protected inside an enclosure or junction box.

See also
 Western Union splice
 T-splice

References

https://web.archive.org/web/20080921113045/http://workmanship.nasa.gov/guidadv_recmeth.jsp

Telecommunications equipment
Electrical wiring
Splices